The 2008 Texas Pro Soccer Festival held in San Antonio, Texas, was a four-team round robin pre-season competition hosted by the San Antonio Metropolitan Youth Soccer Institute (SAMYS) , a 501 (c)3 nonprofit charity cofounded by Dr. Edward P. Sakiewicz. The event was organized in cooperation and assistance with the Houston Dynamo under the leadership of Chris Canetti, President of Business Operations.

The Dynamo were a large part of assisting SAMYS as a week-long pre-season training camp. 2008 marked the first year that the Dynamo hosted a pre-season tournament in cooperation with SAMYS. The participating MLS teams trained daily at Pepsi Soccer, TX, the facility developed by SAMYS in Schertz, Texas. The teams competed amongst each other in double-header exhibition matches at Steele Stadium in Cibolo, Texas.

The 2008 Texas Pro Soccer Festival also featured a celebrity game, played during the day between the 2nd and 3rd matchdays. The celebrities who appeared included Ethan Zohn and Jenna Morasca of Survivor fame, as well as Anthony LaPaglia and Eric Wynalda., Thoma Rongen, Carlos and Gabe Garcia (formerly D.C. United). and other players such as Marcello Balboa, Preki and others.

Participating Teams and Results

Matches

Scorers
2 goals
Cezar (D.C. United)
Brian Ching (Houston Dynamo)
Jeff Cunningham (Toronto FC)
1 goal
Martin Brittain (Toronto FC)
Franco Caraccio (Houston Dynamo)
Dwayne DeRosario (Houston Dynamo)
Danny Dichio (Toronto FC)
Jorge Flores (Chivas USA)
Josh Gardner (D.C. United)
Quavas Kirk (D.C. United)
Kiki Musampa (Toronto FC)
Ante Razov (Chivas USA)
Erik Ustruck (Houston Dynamo)
Tony Vairelles (Toronto FC)
Chris Wondolowski (Houston Dynamo)
Own Goals
Kiki Musampa (Toronto FC, playing against Chivas USA)

References

External links
 Official Tournament Website

2008 in American soccer
Sports competitions in San Antonio
Soccer in Texas
Houston Dynamo FC
2008 in sports in Texas